"Shelter from the Storm" is a song by Bob Dylan, released on his album Blood on the Tracks in 1975.

Shelter from the Storm may also refer to:

Shelter from the Storm: A Concert for the Gulf Coast, 2005 television concert
Shelter from the Storm, a 1997 novel by Maris Soule
"Shelter from the Storm", an episode from the 18th season of Arthur
Shelter from the Storm, a 1986 album by PowerSource
Shelter from the Storm, a screenplay by Adam Mazer
"Shelter from the Storm", an episode from the third season of Supergirl